Microvoluta cythara is a species of sea snail, a marine gastropod mollusk in the family Volutomitridae.

Description
The length of the shell attains 9.4 mm.

Distribution
This species occurs in the Coral Sea and off New Caledonia.

References

 Bouchet P. & Kantor Y. 2004. New Caledonia: the major centre of biodiversity for volutomitrid molluscs (Mollusca: Neogastropoda: Volutomitridae). Systematics and Biodiversity 1(4): 467–502
 Y. Kantor, 2010, Checklist of Recent Volutomitridae

External links

Volutomitridae
Gastropods described in 2004